Karl Brenner may refer to:

 Karl-Heinrich Brenner (1895–1954), German general of the Waffen-SS
 Karl Brenner, character in Alias the Doctor